The Seventh-day Adventist Church runs a large educational system throughout the world. As of 2008, 1678 secondary schools are affiliated with the Church. Some schools offer both elementary and secondary education.
They are a part of the Seventh-day Adventist education system, the world's second largest Christian school system.

Southern Africa and Indian Ocean Division

Botswana
 Eastern Gate Academy, Francistown
 Emmanuel Adventist Academy, Molepolole
 Mogoditshane Adventist Primary, Mogoditshane
 Mountain View Adventist Academy, Mogoditshane

South Africa
 Aurum Seventh-Day Adventist Academy
 Bethel high School
 Blue Hills College
 Cancele Senior Secondary School
 Good Hope High School
 Good Hope Primary School
 Grahamstown Adventist School
 Helderberg Pre-primary, Primary, High School and University
 Hillcrest Primary School
 Keitsleigh Primary School
 Paterson Park
 Presda 
 Riverside Primary School
 Sedaven Primary and High School
 West Rand Sda Primary School

Zambia
 Mupapa Secondary School
 Rusangu Secondary School
King' s Highway primary and secondary school
Rusangu University
Emmanuel Adventist Secondary School in Chisamba
Fordina Pandeli Secondary School in Mansa
riverside secondary school

Zimbabwe
 Anderson Adventist High School, Gweru
 Anderson Adventist Primary School, Gweru
 Anderson Mutiweshiri Secondary, Mutiweshiri, Wedza
 Bemhiwa Primary School, Bocha
 Bulawayo Adventist Secondary School, Bulawayo
 Chikwariro Adventist High, Bocha
 Chinembiri Secondary
 Fairview Primary School, Bulawayo
 Gunde Primary and High School, Gweru
 Handina Adventist Primary and Secondary School, Nyazura
 Hanke Mission Primary and Secondary School, Shurugwi
 Karirwi Adventist Mission, Bocha
 Katsenga Secondary
 Lower Gwelo Primary, Secondary and High School, Lower Gwelo
 Lowveld Adventist Primary School, Chiredzi
 Mandora SDA Primary School, Mhondoro/Kadoma
 Maranatha Adventist High, Primary School, Bulawayo
 Marewo Primary School, Bocha
 Mauya Secondary School
 Mkhosana Adventist Secondary School, Victoria Falls
 Mtanki SDA Primary School, Gokwe
 Mukwada Primary and Secondary School (Bocha)
 Mutoranhanga SDA Primary School, Karoi)
Nemane Adventist High School, Tsholotsho
Nemane Adventist Primary School Tsholotsho
 Northwood Adventist Primary School, Mt Pleasant, Harare
 Nyahuni Adventist High School
 Nyazura Adventist Primary and High School, Nyazura
 Phelandaba Primary School, Bulawayo
 Ruya Adventist High School, Mount Darwin
 Shashane Adventist Primary School, Kezi
 Shashane Adventist High School, Kezi
 Solusi Primary, Secondary and High School Bulawayo
 Soluswe Adventist Primary, Tsholotsho
 Tshabanda Primary and Secondary School
 Zhombe SDA Primary School, Gokwe, Bomba Business Centre

East and Central Africa Division

Burundi
 Lycee Delhove de Buganda, Cibitoke
 Lycee Maranatha de Kivoga, Kivoga

Democratic Republic of the Congo
 Lukanga Adventist Institute, Butembo, Nord-Kivu
 Rwamiko Institute, Goma, Kivu
 Songa Institute, Kamina

Ethiopia
 Kebena Seventh-day Adventist School, Addis Ababa
 Akaki Seventh-day Adventist School, Addis Ababa
 Kuyera Adventist Academy, Shoa Region
 Wollega Adventist Academy, Gimbie
Durame Seventh-day Adventist School, (Durame)
Abonsa Seventh-day Adventist School, (Durame/Abonsa)

Kenya
 Chebwai Adventist Secondary School, Western Kenya Conference
 Chuka Adventist secondary school, Tharaka Nithi, Meru
 Gatumbi SDA Primary and Secondary Schools, Central Kenya Conference, Kirinyaga County
 Kabokyek Adventist secondary school, Kericho
 Kagwathi Adventist Secondary School, SabaSaba, Murang'a County
 Kamagambo High School and Teachers' College, Kisii County
 Kanga High School, Ranen Conference, Migori County
 Karura Church School, Nairobi
 Kiirua Adventist Secondary School, Meru
 Kimolwet Mixed Adventist Secondary School, Nandi County
 Kiriiria Seventh-day Adventist Secondary School, Meru, Kenya
 Masii Seventh-day Adventist Secondary School, Masii
 Matutu Mixed Adventist Secondary School, Nyamira Conference
 Maxwell Adventist Academy, Mbagathi, Nairobi
 Menyenya Mixed Adventist High School, Nyamira Conference
 Mutitu Seventh-day Adventist Secondary School, Kikima
 Mweiga Adventist Secondary School, Central Kenya Conference, Nyeri County
 Nyambaria Adventist Secondary School, Nyamira Conference, Kenya
 Nyanchwa Adventist Secondary School, Kisii
 Nyangusu SDA Boarding Primary School, South Kenya Conference
 Ombogo Girls' Academy, Homa Bay, Kenya
 Omobera SDA Girls' High School, South Kenya Conference
 Ranen Mixed Adventist Secondary School, Awendo Kenya
 Rift Valley Adventist Secondary School, Molo
 Segero Baraton Adventist School, Baraton
 Segero Mixed Adventist Secondary School, Western Kenya Field

Rwanda
 Gitwe Adventist Secondary School, Gitarama
 Rwankeri Adventist Secondary School
 Ruhengeri
 Gisenyi Adventist Secondary School, Gisenyi

Sudan
 Eyira Adventist Vocational Academy, Maridi

Tanzania
 Alpha Adventist Schools, Kigoma
 Bupandagila Secondary School, Bariadi
 Busegwe Girls' Secondary School, Mara
 Bwasi Secondary School, Mara
 Canan Adventist Primary School, Arusha
 Chome Secondary School, Same
 Ikizu Secondary School, Musoma
 Iringa Adventist Secondary School, Iringa
 Kabuku Adventist Training College, Tanga
 Kameya Secondary School, Ukerewe
 Kitungwa Adventist Secondary School, Morogoro
 Kongowe Adventist Primary School, Pwani
 Mbeya Adventist Pre and Primary School, Mbeya
 Ndembela Secondary school, Tukuyu
 Nyabihore Secondary School, Mara
 Nyanza Adventist Secondary School, Mwanza
 Nyasincha Secondary School, Mara
 Parane Secondary School, Same
 Suji Secondary School, Same, Kilimanjaro
 Tanzania Adventist Primary School, Arusha
 Tanzania Adventist Secondary School, Arusha
 Temeke Adventist Schools, Dar es Salaam
 University of Arusha, Arusha
 Mbeya Adventist Secondary School, Mbeya

Northern Asia-Pacific Division

China
 Hong Kong Adventist Academy, Clear Water Bay, Sai Kung District, New Territories, Hong Kong
 Kowloon Sam Yuk Secondary School, Kowloon, Hong Kong
 Tai Po Sam Yuk Secondary School, Tai Po, New Territories, Hong Kong

Closed:
 Hong Kong Sam Yuk Secondary School, Happy Valley, Hong Kong
 Sam Yuk Middle School, Sai Kung, New Territories, Hong Kong

Korea
 Anheung Foreign Language Adventist Academy
 Busan Sahm Yook Elementary School
 Chuncheon Sahm Yook Elementary School
 Daegu Sahm Yook Elementary, Middle, and High School
 Daejun Sahm Yook Elementary, and Middle School
 Gwangju Sahm Yook Elementary School
 Hankook Sahm Yook Middle, and High School
 Honam Sahm Yook Middle, and High School
 Seohae Sahm Yook Elementary, Middle, and High School
 Seoul Sahm Yook Elementary, Middle, and High School
 Taegang Sahm Yook Elementary School
 Wonju Sahm Yook Elementary, Middle, and High School
 Yeongnam Sahm Yook Middle, and High School

Taiwan
 The Primacy Collegiate Academy (9-12), Taipei, Taiwan
 Taipei Adventist American School (K-8), Taipei, Taiwan
 Taiwan Adventist International School (9-12), Yuchih, Nantou County, Taiwan

Closed:
 Da Jin Adventist Secondary School, Pin Dong, Taiwan

Inter-American Division

Antigua
 Antigua and Barbuda Seventh-Day Adventist Primary School
 Antigua and Barbuda Seventh-day Adventist School, St. John's
 New Bethel Academy 
 S.D.A. Early-Childhood Development Center

Bahamas
 Bahamas Academy of Seventh Day Adventist, Nassau, New Providence
 Grand Bahama Academy, Freeport, Grand Bahama

Barbados
 Barbados Seventh-day Adventist Secondary School, Dalkeith, St. Michael

Belize
 Belize Adventist Junior College, Calcutta, Corozal District
 Canaan Seventh Day Adventist College, Belize City, Belize District
 Eden Seventh Day Adventist High School Santa Elena, Cayo District
 Valley of Peace Seventh Day Adventist Academy, Valley of Peace, BMP Cayo District
 Providence Seventh Day Adventist High School, San Antonio, Toledo District

Cayman Islands 
 Cayman Academy, George Town, Grand Cayman

Colombia
 Instituto Colombo-Venezolano, Medellín, Antioquia

Costa Rica
 UNADECA, Alajuela

Dominica
 Dominica Seventh-day Adventist Secondary School, Portsmouth, Commonwealth of Dominica

Dominican Republic
 Adventist Dominican Academy, Bonao
 Las Americas Adventist Academy, Azua
 Fanny Lopez Adventist Academy, Santo Domingo
 Los Girasoles Adventist Academy, Santo Domingo
 Juan Pablo Duarte Adventist Academy, Barahona
 Maranatha Adventist Academy, Santo Domingo
 Maria Trinidad Sanchez Adventist Academy, Romana
 Metropolitan Adventist Academy, Santo Domingo
 Ozama Adventist Academy, Santo Domingo
 La Paz Adventist Academy, Santo Domingo

Grenada (Isle of Spice)
 Grenada Seventh-day Adventist Comprehensive School, Mt. Rose, St Patric

Haiti
 College Adventiste du Cap-Haïtien
 Collège Adventiste de Diquini
 Collège Adventiste des Gonaïves
 Collège Adventiste de Morija
 Collège Adventiste de Pétion-Ville
 Collège Adventiste de Vertière 
 Institut Adventiste Franco-Haïtien

Jamaica
 Harrison's Memorial High School, Montego Bay
 Kingsway High School, Kingston
 May Pen High School, Clarendon
 Port Maria High School, St Mary
 Portland High School, Portland
 St Ann's Bay High School, St Ann
 Savanna-la-mar High, Westmoreland
 Victor Dixon High School, Mandeville
 Willowdene High School, Spanish Town

Mexico
 Universidad Linda Vista, Pueblo Nuevo, Solistahuacán, Chiapas
 Universidad de Montemorelos, Montemorelos, Nuevo León
 Universidad de Navojoa, Navojoa, Sonora

Panama
 Colegio Adventista Bilingue de David, Chiriquí
 Colegio Adventista Metropolitano, Panama City
 Seventh Day Adventist Institute IAP, Chiriquí

Puerto Rico
 Bella Vista Academy, Mayagüez
 Central Adventist Academy, Caguas
 Central Adventist Academy, San Sebastian
 East Adventist Academy, Rio Grande
 Ellen+Miller (FEDIINS) Academy, San Juan
 Metropolitan Adventist Academy, San Juan
 North Adventist Academy, Arecibo
 North Adventist Regional Academy, Vega Baja
 Northwestern Adventist Academy, Aguadilla
 South Adventist Academy, Guayama
 Southern Adventist Academy, Ponce
 Southwestern Adventist Academy, Sabana Grande
 Western Adventist Academy (Academia Adventista del Oeste), Mayagüez

Dutch Caribbean
 Seventh-Day Adventist School, St. Eustatius

St. Lucia
 St. Lucia Seventh-day Adventist Academy, Castries

St. Vincent & the Grenadines
 Bequia Seventh Day Adventist Secondary School, Port Elizabeth
 Mountain View Adventist Academy, Richland Park, Charlotte

Trinidad & Tobago
 Bates Memorial High School, Sangre Grande
 Caribbean Union College Secondary School, Maracas-St.Joseph
 Harmon School of S.D.A., Tobago
 Pinehaven S.D.A. Primary School, Arima
 Rio Claro S.D.A. Primary School, Rio Claro
 Southern Academy, San Fernando

North American Division

Bermuda
 Bermuda Institute, Southampton

Canada

Alberta (12)
 Chinook Winds Adventist Academy, Calgary, Alberta
 Coralwood Adventist Academy, Edmonton, Alberta
 College Heights Christian School, Lacombe, Alberta
 Parkview Adventist Academy, Lacombe, Alberta
 Prairie Adventist Christian eSchool, Lacombe, Alberta
 Higher Ground Christian School, Medicine Hat, Alberta
 Mamawi Atosketan Native School, Ponoka, Alberta
 Woodlands Adventist School, Ponoka, Alberta
 South Side Christian School, Red Deer, Alberta
 Sylvan Meadows Adventist School, Sylvan Lake, Alberta
 Peace Hills Adventist School, Wetaskiwin, Alberta

British Columbia (14)
 West Coast Adventist Christian School, Abbotsford, British Columbia
 Fraser Valley Adventist Academy, Aldergrove, British Columbia
 North Okanagan Jr. Academy, Armstrong, British Columbia
 Bella Coola Adventist School, Bella Coola, British Columbia
 Deer Lake School, Burnaby, British Columbia
 Peace Christian School, Chetwynd, British Columbia
 Chilliwack Adventist Christian School, Chilliwack, British Columbia
 Okanagan Christian School, Kelowna, British Columbia
 Robson Valley Junior Academy, McBride, British Columbia
 Avalon Adventist Junior Academy, Port Hardy, British Columbia
 Shuswap Seventh-day Adventist School, Salmon Arm, British Columbia
 Pleasant Valley Christian Academy, Vernon, British Columbia
 Lakeview Christian School, Victoria, British Columbia
 Cariboo Adventist Academy, Williams Lake, British Columbia
 Fountainview Academy, Lillooet, British Columbia

Manitoba (1)
 Red River Valley Junior Academy, Winnipeg, Manitoba, Canada

Nova Scotia (1)
 Sandy Lake Academy, Bedford, Nova Scotia

Ontario (10)
 Near North Adventist Christian School, Barrie, Ontario
 Crawford Adventist Academy – Peel Campus, Caledon, Ontario
 Adventist Christian Elementary School, London, Ontario
 Grandview Adventist Academy, Mount Hope, Ontario
 College Park Elementary School (Oshawa, Ontario), Oshawa, Ontario
 Kingsway College, Oshawa, Ontario
 Ottawa Adventist School, Ottawa, Ontario
 Crawford Adventist Academy East, Pickering, Ontario
 Crawford Adventist Academy, Toronto, Ontario
 Windsor Adventist Elementary School, Windsor, Ontario
 Peel Adventist Elementary School, Brampton, Ontario

Quebec (2)
 Greaves Adventist Academy, Montreal
 Sartigan Adventist Academy (Académie Adventiste de Sartigan), Saint-Georges, Quebec

Saskatchewan (3)
 Curtis-Horne Christian School, Regina, Saskatchewan
 Rosthern Christian School, Rosthern, Saskatchewan
 Seventh-day Adventist Christian School, Saskatoon, Saskatchewan

Not Church-owned but affiliated:
 Fountainview Academy, Lillooet, British Columbia
 Grandview Adventist Academy, Mount Hope, Ontario

United States

South America Division

Argentina
 Alta Gracia Adventist Academy, Posadas, Misiones
 Bahía Blanca Adventist Academy, Bahía Blanca, Buenos Aires Province
 Balcarce Adventist Academy, Balcarce, Buenos Aires Province
 Capitan Bermudez Adventist Academy, Capitán Bermúdez, Santa Fe Province
 Córdoba Adventist Academy, Córdoba
 Florida Adventist Academy, Florida, Buenos Aires Province
 Formosa Adventist Academy, Formosa
 Mariano Moreno Adventist Academy, Posadas, Misiones
 Mendoza Adventist Academy, Mendoza
 Moron Adventist Academy, Morón, Buenos Aires Province
 North Argentine Academy, Leandro N. Alem, Misiones
 Parana Adventist Institute, Parana, Entre Ríos
 Los Polvorines Adventist Academy, Los Polvorines, Buenos Aires Province
 Puerto Iguazú Adventist Academy, Puerto Iguazu, Misiones
 Resistencia Adventist Academy, Resistencia, Chaco
 River Plate Adventist University Academy, Libertador San Martin, Entre Ríos
 Salta Adventist Academy, Salta
 Santa Fe Adventist Academy, Santa Fe
 Villa Regina Adventist Academy, Villa Regina, Río Negro

Bolivia
 Bolivia Adventist University Academy, Vinto, Cochabamba
 Los Andes Adventist Academy, La Paz

Brazil
 Adventist Agricultural-Industrial Academy, Manaus, AM
 Adventist School, Cachoeirinha, RS
 Adventist School, Pelotas, RS
 Agro-Industrial Adventist Trans-Amazon Academy, Uruara, PA
 Anápolis Adventist School, Anápolis, GO
 Arruda Adventist Academy, Recife, PE
 Belo Horizonte Adventist Academy, Belo Horizonte, MG
 Boqueirao Seventh-day Adventist School, Curitiba, PR
 Brazil Adventist University Academy, Engenheiro Coelho, Engenheiro Coelho, SP
 Brazil Adventist University Academy, Hortolandia, Hortolandia, SP
 Brazil Adventist University Academy, São Paulo, São Paulo, SP
 Campo Grande Adventist Academy, Rio de Janeiro, RJ
 Campo Mourao Seventh-day Adventist School, Campo Mourão, PR
 Cascavel Seventh-day Adventist School, Cascavel, PR
 Castelo Branco Adventist Academy, Salvador, BA
 Central Brazil Academy, Abadiania, GO
 Cruzeiro do Sul Adventist Academy, Taquara, RS
 Elza Gutzeit Adventist Academy of Altamira, Altamira, PA
 Espirito Santo Academy, Colatina, ES
 Eunapolis Adventist Academy, Eunapolis, BA
 Fortaleza Adventist Academy, Fortaleza, CE
 Foz do Iguaçu Seventh-day Adventist School, Foz do Iguaçu, PR
 Goiânia Adventist School, Goiânia, GO
 Grao Para Adventist Academy, Belém, PA
 Gravatai Seventh-day Adventist School, Gravatai, RS
 Imperatriz Adventist Academy, Imperatriz, MA
 Ipatinga Adventist Academy, Ipatinga, MG
 Itaborai Adventist Academy, Itaboraí, RJ
 Itabuna Adventist Secondary School, Itabuna, BA
 Jacarepagua Adventist Academy, Rio de Janeiro, RJ
 Jardim Europa Adventist School, Goiânia, GO
 Ji-Parana Adventist Academy, Ji-Paraná, RO
 Londrina Seventh-day Adventist School, Londrina, PR
 Maceio Adventist Academy, Maceio, AL
 Manaus Adventist Academy, Manaus, AM
 Maraba Adventist Academy, Marabá, PA
 Marechal Rondon Seventh-day Adventist School, Porto Alegre, RS
 Maringa Seventh-day Adventist School, Maringá, PR
 Minas Gerais Adventist Academy, Lavras, MG
 New City Adventist Academy, Ananindeua, PA
 Northeast Brazil Academy, Cachoeira, BA
 Novo Hamburgo Seventh-day Adventist School, Novo Hamburgo, RS
 Novo Mundo Adventist School, Goiânia, GO
 Parana Adventist Academy, Ivatuba, Parana
 Partenon Seventh-day Adventist School, Porto Alegre, RS
 Paul Bernard Adventist Academy, Manaus, AM
 Pedro Ludovico Adventist School, Goiânia, GO
 Petropolis Adventist Academy, Petropolis, RJ
 Porangatu Adventist School, Porangatu, GO
 Portão Seventh-day Adventist School, Curitiba, PR
 Porto Alegre Seventh-day Adventist School, Porto Alegre, RS
 Porto Velho Adventist Academy, Porto Velho, RO
 Recife Adventist Academy, Recife, PE
 Rio Branco Adventist Academy, Rio Branco, AC
 Rio Verde Adventist School, Rio Verde, Goiás, GO
 Rio de Janeiro Adventist Academy, Rio de Janeiro, RJ
 Salvador Adventist Academy (Villa El Salvador), Salvador, BA
 Santa Catarina Adventist Academy, Araquari, SC
 Sao Luiz Adventist Academy, São Luís, MA
 Tucuma Adventist Academy, Tucuma, PA
 Uruaçu Adventist School, Uruaçu, GO
 Viamao Seventh-day Adventist School, Viamão, RS
 Vila Nova Adventist School, Goiânia, GO
 Vitoria Adventist Academy, Vitoria, ES
 West Amazon Adventist Academy, Mirante da Serra, RO
 Sarandi Seventh-day Adventist Elementary School, Porto Alegre, RS

Chile
 Los Ángeles Adventist Academy (Chile), Camino Antuco, Los Ángeles
 Angol Adventist Academy, Villa Ecal, Angol
 Antofagasta Adventist Academy, Antofagasta
 Arica Adventist Academy, Arica
 Buenaventura Adventist Academy, Santiago
 Calama Adventist Academy, Calama
 Chile Adventist University Academy, Chillán
 La Cisterna Academy, Santiago
 Concepción Adventist Academy (Chile), Concepción
 Las Condes Adventist Academy, Las Condes, Santiago
 Copiapo Adventist Academy, Copiapó
 Molina Adventist Academy, Molina
 North Santiago Academy, Santiago
 Osorno Adventist Academy, Osorno
 Porvenir Adventist Academy, Santiago
 Puerto Montt Adventist Academy, Puerto Montt
 Punta Arenas Adventist Academy, Punta Arenas
 Quilpue Adventist Academy, Quilpué
 La Serena Adventist Academy, La Serena
 South Santiago Adventist Academy, Santiago
 Talcahuano Adventist Academy, Huertos Familiares, Talcahuano
 Temuco Adventist Academy, Villa Los Cradores, Temuco
 Valdivia Adventist Academy, Valdivia
 West Santiago Adventist Academy, Lo Prado, Santiago

Ecuador
 Ecuador Adventist Superior Technical Institute Secondary School, Santo Domingo de los Colorados, Pichincha
 Pacific Adventist Academy, Guayaquil
 Quito Adventist Academy, Quito

Paraguay
 Asunción Adventist Academy, Asunción
 East Paraguay Adventist Academy, Distrito Yguazú, Depto. Alto Paraná

Peru
 28 de Julio Adventist College, Tacna
 Amazonas Adventist College, Iquitos
 Unión Americana Adventist College, Ica
 Brasil Adventist College, Jesús María, Lima
 Daniel Alcides Carrión Adventist College, La Esperanza, Trujillo
 Eduardo F. Forga Adventist College, Arequipa
 José Pardo Adventist College, Cuzco
 José de San Martín Adventist College, Trujillo
 Miraflores Adventist College, Miraflores, Lima
 Unión Adventist College, Chaclacayo, Lima
 Portales del Saber Adventist College, Ate, Lima
 El Porvenir Adventist College, Chepén, Trujillo
 Salvador Adventist College, Villa El Salvador, Lima
 Ucayali Adventist College, Pucallpa, Ucayali

Uruguay
 Uruguay Adventist Academy, Progreso, Canelones

South Pacific Division

Australia

 Avondale School (Cooranbong), NSW
 Blue Hills College, Goonellebah, NSW
 Border Christian College, Thurgoona, NSW
 Brisbane Adventist College, Mansfield, QLD
 Carlisle Adventist Christian College, Beaconsfield, QLD
 Carmel Adventist College, Perth, WA
 Central Coast Adventist School, Erina, NSW
 Darling Downs Christian School, Toowoomba, QLD
 Edinburgh College, Lilydale, VIC
 Gilson College, Taylors Hill, VIC
 Gold Coast Christian College, Reedy Creek, QLD
 Henderson College, Irymple, VIC
 Heritage College, Narre Warren South, VIC
 Hilliard Christian School, West Moonah, TAS
 Hills Adventist College, Sydney, NSW
 Macarthur Adventist College, Macquarie Fields, NSW
 Macquarie College, Wallsend, NSW
 Mountain View Adventist College, Doonside, NSW
 Noosa Christian College, Cooroy, QLD
 North West Christian School, Penguin, TAS
 Northpine Christian College, Dakabin, QLD
 Nunawading Christian College, Nunawading, VIC
 Prescott Schools including Prescott College, Prospect, SA
 Sydney Adventist College, Strathfield, NSW
 Tweed Valley Adventist College, Murwillumbah, NSW
 Wahroonga Adventist School, Wahroonga, NSW

Not owned by the church but affiliated:
 Karalundi College, Meekatharra, WA

Cook Islands
 Papaaroa High School, Rarotonga

Fiji
 Fulton University (modern name), Sabeto, Nadi
 Lautoka ADventist Primary School, Lautoka
 Naqia Adventist Primary School, Naqia
 Navesau Adventist High School, Wainibuka, Wainibuka
 Suva Adventist College, Lami, Suva
 Suva Adventist Primary School, Lami, Suva
 Vatuvonu Adventist High School, Natewa, Vanua Levu

French Polynesia
 Tiarama Adventist College, Papeete, Tahiti

Kiribati
 Kauma Adventist High School, Tarawa

Marshall Islands
 Delap SDA School
 Ebeye SDA School

New Zealand
 Auckland Seventh-day Adventist High School, Auckland
 Christchurch Adventist School, Christchurch
 Longburn Adventist College, Palmerston North
 Southland Adventist Christian School, Invercargill

Papua New Guinea
 Inonda Adventist Junior High School Oro Province, Popondetta, PNG
 Kabiufa Adventist Secondary School, Goroka
 Kambubu Adventist Secondary School, Rabual
 Mount Diamond Adventist Secondary School, Central Province
 Paglum Adventist High School, Western Highlands Province, Mount Hagen, PNG
 Koiari Park Adventist High School, Port Moresby, NCD, PNG
 Devare Adventist High School, Arawa, Bougainville

Samoa
 Samoa Adventist College, Apia

American Samoa
 Iakina Adventist Academy, Pago Pago

Solomon Islands
 Afutara Adventist Vocational School, Auki, Malaita
 Batuna Adventist Vocational School, Marovo Lagoon
 Betikama Adventist College, Guadalcanal
 Kukudu Adventist College, Western Province

Tonga
 Beulah College, Tongatapu

Vanuatu
 Aore Adventist Academy, Santo
 Epauto Adventist High School, Efate

South Asia-Pacific Division

Sri Lanka 

 Adventist International School, Negombo

Cambodia
 Cambodia Adventist School, Phnom Penh

Not church-owned but affiliated:
 Cambodia Adventist School – Kantrok, Siem Reap

Indonesia

Malaysia

Sabah
 Goshen Adventist Secondary School, Kota Marudu
 Sabah Adventist Secondary School, Tamparuli
Primary Schools
Adventist Primary School Tamparuli
Adventist Primary School Tenghilan, Tamparuli
Adventist Primary School Gaur, Kota Belud
Adventist Primary School Rangalau, Kota Belud
Adventist Primary School Kalawat, Kota Belud
Adventist Primary School Sungoi, Kota Marudu
Adventist Primary School Tagaroh, Kota Marudu
Adventist Primary School Goshen, Kota Marudu
Adventist Primary School Damai, Kota Marudu
Adventist Primary School Tambuluran, Kota Marudu
Adventist Primary School Bambangan, Kota Marudu
Adventist Primary School Marabau, Kudat

Sarawak
 Sunny Hill School, Kuching

Philippines

Singapore
 San Yu Adventist School

Thailand
 Adventist Ekamai School, Bangkok
 Adventist International Mission School, Muak Lek
 Bangkok Advent School
 Bangkok Adventist International School, Bangkok
 Chiangmai Adventist Academy, Chiang Mai
 Eden Valley Academy, Tak
 Ekamai International School, Bangkok
 Karen Adventist Academy, Mae Hong Son
 Ramkhamhaeng Advent International School, Bangkok
 Them Amnuay Vithaya, Phuket
 Thep Amnuay Hat Yai School, Songkhla
 Trinity International School, Bangkok
 Korat Adventist International School, Nakhon Ratchasima

Southern Asia Division

India
 Seventh-Day Adventist Matriculation High School, Marthandam, (Viricode) Tamil Nadu.
 Adventpuram Seventh-day Adventist School, Thiruvananthapuram, Kerala
 Ambalavayal Seventh-day Adventist School, Wayanad, Kerala
 Azamnagar Seventh-day Adventist High School, Belgaum, Karnataka
 Bahraich Seventh-day Adventist Senior Secondary School, Bahraich, Uttar Pradesh
 Bangalore (HAL) Seventh-day Adventist Higher Secondary School, Bangalore, Karnataka
 Bangalore Seventh-day Adventist Higher Secondary School, Bangalore, Karnataka
 Bhalki Seventh-day Adventist High School, Bidar, Karnataka
 Bidar Seventh-day Adventist High School, Bidar, Karnataka
 Bobbili Seventh-day Adventist Higher Secondary School, Bobbili, Andhra Pradesh
 Brooke Side Adventist Higher Secondary School, Shillong, Meghalaya
 Busy Bee Seventh-day Adventist High School, Goa
 Calicut Seventh-day Adventist School, Kozhikode, Kerala
 Chengalpet Seventh-day Adventist Higher Secondary School, Chengalpet, Tamil Nadu
 Chennai Seventh-day Adventist Higher Secondary School, Chennai, Tamil Nadu
 Chickmagalur Seventh-day Adventist High School, Chickmagalur, Karnataka
 Dharmapuri Seventh-day Adventist Matric. Hr. Sec. School, Collectorate, Dharmapuri, Tamil Nadu
 Dindigul Seventh-day Adventist Higher Secondary School, Dindigul, Tamil Nadu
 E D Thomas Memorial Higher Secondary School, Thanjavur District, Tamil Nadu
 Ernakulam Seventh-day Adventist Higher Secondary School, Kochi, Kerala
 Erode Seventh-day Adventist High School, Erode, Tamil Nadu
 Flaiz Memorial Higher Secondary School of Seventh-day Adventists, West Godavari District, Andhra Pradesh
 Hapur Seventh-day Adventist Senior Secondary School, Hapur, Uttar Pradesh
 Hatkanangale Seventh-day Adventist Secondary School, Kolhapur, Maharashtra
 Helen Lowry Higher Secondary School, Aizawl, Mizoram
 Hosur Seventh-day Adventist Higher Secondary School, Hosur, Tamil Nadu
 Hubli Seventh-day Adventist High School, Hubli, Karnataka
 Hyderabad Seventh-day Adventist Higher Secondary School, Hyderabad, Andhra Pradesh
 Ibrahimpatnam Seventh-day Adventist Higher Secondary School, Krishna District, Andhra Pradesh
 Indore Seventh-day Adventist Higher Secondary School, Indore, Madhya Pradesh
 Iritty Seventh-day Adventist Secondary School, Iritty, Kerala
 Jalahalli Seventh-day Adventist Higher Secondary School, Bangalore, Karnataka
 Jalandhar Seventh-day Adventist Senior Secondary School, Jalandhar, Punjab
 James Memorial Higher Secondary School, V.O.C. District, Tamil Nadu
 Kadugondanahalli Seventh-day Adventist High School, Bangalore, Karnataka
 Kaduthuruthy Seventh-day Adventist School, Kottayam, Kerala
 Kariavattom Seventh-day Adventist Secondary School, Thiruvananthapuram, Kerala
 Kattachal Seventh-day Adventist School, Kollam, Kerala
 KGF Seventh-day Adventist High School, KGF, Karnataka
 Khunti Seventh-day Adventist Senior Secondary School, Ranchi, Jharkhand
 Khurda Seventh-day Adventist Higher Secondary School, Khurda District, Orissa
 Kochadai Seventh-day Adventist High School, Madurai, Tamil Nadu
 Kodambakkam Seventh-day Adventist High School, Chennai, Tamil Nadu
 Kolar Seventh-day Adventist High School, Kolara, Karnataka
 Kolhapur Seventh-day Adventist Higher Secondary School, Kolhapur, Maharashtra
 Kolkata Seventh-day Adventist High School, Kolkata, West Bengal
 Kollam Seventh-day Adventist School, Kollam, Kerala
 Kollegal Seventh-day Adventist High School, Kollegal, Karnataka
 Kottarakara Seventh-day Adventist Higher Secondary School, Kottarakara, Kerala
 Kovilpatti Seventh-day Adventist Higher Secondary School, Kovilpatti, Tamil Nadu
 Kowdiar Seventh-day Adventist School, Thiruvananthapuram, Kerala
 Kozhencherry Seventh-day Adventist School, Kozhencherry, Kerala
 Krishnagiri Seventh-day Adventist School, Krishnagiri, Tamil Nadu
 Kulathupuzha Seventh-day Adventist School, Kollam, Kerala
 Kuttapuzha Seventh-day Adventist Higher Secondary School, Thiruvalla, Kerala
 Lakkavaram Seventh-day Adventist High School, E. G. District, Andhra Pradesh
 Lasalgaon Seventh-day Adventist Higher Secondary School, Nasik District, Maharashtra
 Lowry Memorial Higher Secondary School, Bangalore, Karnataka
 Lucknow Seventh-day Adventist Senior Secondary School, Lucknow, Uttar Pradesh
 M. C. Dhamanwala English Higher Secondary School of Seventh-day Adventists, Surat, Gujarat
 Machilipatnam Seventh-day Adventist High School, Krishna District, Andhra Pradesh
 Madurai Central Seventh-day Adventist Matriculation Higher Secondary School, Madurai, Tamil Nadu
 Madurai East Seventh-day Adventist Higher Secondary School, Madurai, Tamil Nadu
 Madurai North Seventh-day Adventist Higher Secondary School, Madurai, Tamil Nadu
 Madurai South Seventh-day Adventist Higher Secondary School, Madurai, Tamil Nadu
 Manamadurai Seventh-day Adventist Higher Secondary School, Manamadurai, Tamil Nadu
 Maninagar Seventh-day Adventist Higher Secondary School, Ahmedabad, Gujarat
 Mavelikara Seventh-day Adventist Higher Secondary School, Mavelikara, Kerala
 METAS of Seventh Day Adventist School,Surat ,Gujarat
 Mysore Seventh-day Adventist High School, Mysore, Karnataka
 Navsari Seventh-day Adventist Higher Secondary School, Navsari, Gujarat
 Nedumkandam Seventh-day Adventist Secondary School, Idukki, Kerala
 Nettithozhu Seventh-day Adventist School, Idukki, Kerala
 Neyveli Seventh-day Adventist Higher Secondary School, Neyveli, Tamil Nadu
 Seventh day Adventist school Lasalgaon, Nashik, Maharastra
 Seventh day Adventist school Vyara, Surat, Gujarat
 Nilambur Seventh-day Adventist School, Nilambur, Kerala
 Nuzvid Seventh-day Adventist Higher Secondary School, Krishna District, Andhra Pradesh
 Ottapalam Seventh-day Adventist Higher Secondary School, Ottapalam, Kerala
 Palakkad Seventh-day Adventist Higher Secondary School, Palakkad, Kerala
 Panruti Seventh-day Adventist Higher Secondary School, Panruti, Tamil Nadu
 Pathanamthitta Seventh-day Adventist Higher Secondary School, Pathanamthitta, Kerala
 Periyakulam Seventh-day Adventist Higher Secondary School, Periyakulam, Tamil Nadu
 Pondicherry Seventh-day Adventist Higher Secondary School, Pondicherry, Puducherry
 Pulieranghy Seventh-day Adventist Higher Secondary School, Pulieranghy, Tamil Nadu
 Raymond Memorial Higher Secondary School, Jalpaiguri District, West Bengal
 Rohru Seventh-day Adventist High School, Shimla, Himachal Pradesh
 Rajapalayam Seventh-day Adventist School, Rajapalayam, Tamil Nadu
 Sankarankoil Seventh-day Adventist Higher Secondary School, Sankarankoil, Tamil Nadu
 Santhampara Seventh-day Adventist School, Idukki, Kerala
 SDA Residential English High School, Nedumkandam, Kerala
 Secunderabad Seventh-day Adventist High School, Secunderabad, Andhra Pradesh
 Seventh-day Adventist Higher Secondary School, Gandhi Nagar, Puducherry
 Seventh-day Adventist Higher Secondary School, Sadar, Nagpur, Maharashtra
 Seventh-day Adventist Higher Secondary School, Sanpada, Navi Mumbai, Maharashtra
 Seventh-day Adventist Higher Secondary School, Shanmugapuram, Puducherry
 Seventh-day Adventist Higher Secondary School, Trichy
 Seventh-day Adventist Inter College, "The Retreat", Roorkee, UK
 Seventh-day Adventist Senior Secondary School, Vidhan Sabha Marj, Lucknow, UP
 Sivakasi Seventh-day Adventist High School, Sivakasi, Tamil Nadu
 Spicer Memorial College Higher Secondary School, Pune, Maharashtra
 Sulthan Battery Seventh-day Adventist School, Sultan Battery, Kerala
 Sunshine Home and High School of Seventh-day Adventists, Bangalore, Karnataka
 Tambaram Seventh-day Adventist High School, Chennai, Tamil Nadu
 Thachampara Seventh-day Adventist School, Palakkad, Kerala
 Thanjavur Seventh-day Adventist Higher Secondary School, Thanjavur, Tamil Nadu
 Thiruchengode Seventh-day Adventist Higher Secondary School, Thiruchengode, Tamil Nadu
 Thirumala Seventh-day Adventist Secondary School, Thiruvananthapuram, Kerala
 Thiruvilwamala Seventh-day Adventist Higher Secondary School, Thrissur, Kerala
 Thrissur Seventh-day Adventist Higher Secondary School, Thrissur, Kerala
 Tonia Seventh-day Adventist School, Tonia, Jharkhand
 Tuticorin Seventh-day Adventist High School, Tuticorin, Tamil Nadu
 Usilampatti Seventh-day Adventist High School, Usilampatti, Tamil Nadu
 Vadavathoor Seventh-day Adventist Secondary School, Kottayam, Kerala
 Valavanur Seventh-day Adventist Higher Secondary School, Viluppuram, Tamil Nadu
 Vallakadavu Seventh-day Adventist School, Thiruvananthapuram, Kerala
 Vattapara Seventh-day Adventist School, Thiruvananthapuram, Kerala
 Vijayawada Seventh-day Adventist High School, Vijayawada, Andhra Pradesh
 Virudhunagar Tambakarnar Memorial Seventh-day Adventist Higher Secondary School, Virudhunagar, Tamil Nadu
 Visakhapatnam Seventh-day Adventist High School, MVP Colony, Visakhapatnam, Andhra Pradesh
 Visakhapatnam Seventh-day Adventist High School, Visakhapatnam, Andhra Pradesh

Inter-European Division

Austria
 Seminar Schloss Bogenhofen, Bogenhofen

France
 Maurice-Tièche Comprehensive School, Collonges-sous-Salève

Germany
 Schulzentrum Marienhöhe, Darmstadt

Portugal
 Funchal Primary School, Madeira
 Oficina de Talentos, Primary school, Lisbon
 Oliveira do Douro Secondary School, Vila Nova Gaia
 Primary School, Setúbal

Romania
 Maranatha Adventist High School, Cluj-Napoca, judetul Cluj
 Onisim Adventist High School, Craiova, jud. Dolj
 Stefan Demetrescu Adventist High School, Bucharest

Spain
 Educativo Adventista de Sagunto, Sagunto, Valencia
 Rigel School, Zaragoza
 Timón School, Madrid
 Urgell School, Barcelona

Switzerland
 Adventist Private School, Zürich

Trans-European Division

Croatia
 Srednja škola u Maruševcu s pravom javnosti, Maruševec

Finland
Finland Junior College, Piikkio, Finland

Norway
 Engesvea Barne og Ungdomsskole, Lillehammer
 Nidelven Skole, Trondheim
 Tyrifjord Videregående Skole, Røyse
 Østmarka Skole, Oslo

Serbia
 Gimnazija Živorad Janković, Novi Sad

United Kingdom
 Harper Bell Seventh Day Adventist School, Camp Hill, Birmingham, England
 The John Loughborough School, Tottenham, London, England (closed 2013)
 Stanborough School, Watford, Hertfordshire, England

Euro-Asia Division

Russia
 Zaoksky Adventist School, Zaoksky
 ZaokSKY Adventist University, Zaoksky

See also
 List of Seventh-day Adventist colleges and universities
 List of Seventh-day Adventist hospitals

Sources
 Adventist Yearbook
 Adventist Academy Llnks 
 Adventist K-12 Schools
 Adventist Directory Locate Adventist Entities
 Seventh Day Adventist Church South Pacific Division Administration Directory, 2006
 Southeast Asia Union Mission Primary/Secondary Schools

References

 
Lists of Christian schools
Secondary schools